The 3rd Gemini Awards were held in 1988 to honour achievements in Canadian television. It was broadcast on CBC.

Awards

Best Variety Program or Series
 It's Only Rock & Roll
 The Comedy Mill
 The Tommy Hunter Show

Best Dramatic Series
 Degrassi Junior High
 Night Heat
 He Shoots, He Scores
 Street Legal

Best Dramatic Mini Series
 Anne of Avonlea
 Hoover vs. The Kennedys
 The King Chronicle

Best Information Program or Series
 Venture
 Land and Sea
 Monitor
 Reckoning: The Political Economy of Canada

Best Children's Series
 Mr. Dressup
 Ramona
 Today's Special
 What's New
 Wonderstruck

Best Writing in a Dramatic Program
 Night Heat
 Adderly
 Captain Power and the Soldiers of the Future
 He Shoots, He Scores
 The Beachcombers

Best Writing in a Comedy or Variety Program or Series
 Family Reunion
 Breaking All the Rules
 9th Genie Awards
 The Raccoons

Best Direction in a Dramatic Series or Comedy Series
 Degrassi Junior High
 Danger Bay
 Night Heat
 The Beachcombers

Best Performance by a Lead Actor in a Continuing Dramatic Series
 Pat Mastroianni, Degrassi Junior High
 Patrick Bauchau, Mount Royal
 Scott Hylands, Night Heat
 Winston Rekert, Adderly
 Donnelly Rhodes, Danger Bay

Best Performance by a Lead Actress in a Continuing Dramatic Series
 Sonja Smits, Street Legal
 Ocean Hellman, Danger Bay
 Sarah Polley, Ramona
 Jessica Steen, Captain Power and the Soldiers of the Future

Best Performance by a Broadcast Journalist
 Roger Smith
 Robert Hurst
 Don Murray

Earle Grey Award
 Kate Reid

TV Guide's Most Popular Program Award
 Night Heat

Best Animated Program or Series
 The Raccoons

03
Gemini Awards, 1988
Gemini Awards, 1988